Opera Gallery is a modern and contemporary art gallery presenting work by established and emerging artists of the 20th and 21st centuries. 
 
Founded in Paris in 1994 by Gilles Dyan, Opera Gallery now has thirteen exhibition spaces in New York, Miami, Bal Harbour, Aspen, London, Paris, Monaco, Geneva, Dubai, Beirut, Hong Kong, Singapore and Seoul. 

Besides a permanent exhibition, Opera Gallery organizes about four solo shows and curated exhibitions a year, in each of its spaces.

Opera Gallery represents Ellen Von Unwerth, Manolo Valdés, André Brasilier, Nick Gentry, Lita Cabellut, Pablo Atchugarry, Marcello Lo Giudice, Andy Denzler, Joe Black, David Kim Whittaker, Seo Young-Deok, David Mach, and Umberto Mariani.

References

Opera Gallery New York 2017 Exhibition Bernard Buffet
Opera Gallery Dubai Manolo Valdes Exhibition 2018

External links 

Founder Gilles Dyan on Artsy
Interview with Gilles Dyan

Contemporary art galleries in France
Art galleries established in 1994
1994 establishments in France
Art galleries in London
Art museums and galleries in Manhattan